Jayme Platt (born July 26, 1978) is an American retired ice hockey goaltender.

Career 
Platt began his career playing at junior level for the Des Moines Buccaneers in the USHL.  In two seasons with the Buccaneers, Platt played in 41 regular season and 2 post season games.

In 1997 he began his university level career, playing in the NCAA for Lake Superior State University.  Platt would spend four seasons with Lake Superior, but would share the goaltending duties, and could not force his way into a regular first team spot.  His performances impressed enough for the ECHL team the Greenville Grrrowl to sign Platt for the 2001/02 season though.  In his first senior season, Platt played in 40 games, and kept his goals against average down to 2.53.

He would again play for the Grrrowl the following season, but would also spend time icing for the Dayton Bombers as well as a handful of games for the AHL Lowell Lock Monsters.  For the 2003/04 season, Platt made the decision to move to Europe and sign for the EIHL team the Manchester Phoenix.  It was a move which brought the best from Platt, who would be voted into the EIHL All-Star Second Team due to his outstanding performances - in 56 games, his goals against average was 2.60.

His impressive debut season led to his signature being sought by a number of teams in the off-season.  Platt made the decision to remain in the U.K. though, and signed for the Phoenix's rivals, the Sheffield Steelers. Platt would again impress and in 41 games kept his average down to 2.15, improving again from his previous season.

The American goaltender would continue to move around the EIHL the following season, as he signed for the Basingstoke Bison.  Unfortunately, he played in just 5 games for the Bison before being released by mutual consent. Platt returned to North America and signed for the Danbury Trashers of the UHL, where he would finish the 2005/06 season. Due to the fraud scandal which enveloped the Trashers, the franchise was suspended from operations in 2006. Platt retired as a player afterwards.

Awards and honours

External links

Jayme Platt Personal Profile, Manchester Phoenix Official Website.

1978 births
Living people
American men's ice hockey goaltenders
Basingstoke Bison players
Danbury Trashers players
Dayton Bombers players
Des Moines Buccaneers players
Greenville Grrrowl players
Lake Superior State Lakers men's ice hockey players
Lowell Lock Monsters players
Manchester Phoenix players
Sheffield Steelers players
Sportspeople from Redmond, Washington
Ice hockey people from Washington (state)
AHCA Division I men's ice hockey All-Americans